Kevin Walker (born October 20, 1963) who went to Ben L. Smith High School in Greensboro, North Carolina was an All American defensive back for East Carolina University and the Tampa Bay Buccaneers of the National Football League (NFL).

While Walker was a playing for the East Carolina Pirates, he was the university’s Most Valuable Defensive Player in 1985. He led the nation with nine interceptions in the 1985 college football season.

Walker was Second-team All South Independent in 1984 and was First-team All South Independent in 1985. He led East Carolina University in most interceptions for three seasons. He recorded five interceptions in 1983, four interceptions in 1984 and nine interceptions in 1985.

In 1986, the Tampa Bay Buccaneers drafted Walker in the 6th round with 165th pick. He played for two seasons with the Buccaneers.

References

1963 births
Living people
East Carolina Pirates football players
American football defensive backs
Tampa Bay Buccaneers players
Players of American football from Greensboro, North Carolina
National Football League replacement players